The Château de Bouxwiller was a moated castle situated in the département of Bas-Rhin, Alsace, France, constructed in the 15th century under its lords, the von Lichtenberg family.  Remodeled many times, the château served more as a residence than a military post. In the 18th century, its attractive and terraced French-styled gardens were very well known.

However, the original building did not survive the destruction of the French Revolution.  Its replacement of the same name is located in the Place du château in the town of Bouxwiller.

Notes

External links
Association Châteaux Forts et Villes Fortifiés d'Alsace: Bouxwiller

Bibliography
 Collectif, Pays d'Alsace, Bouxwiller, tome un, cahier 131 bis. Imprimerie Veit, Société d'Histoire et d'Archéologie de Saverne et Environs, 1985 (143 pp.) 
 Collectif, Pays d'Alsace, Bouxwiller, tome deux, cahier 149 bis. Imprimerie Veit, Société d'Histoire et d'Archéologie de Saverne et Environs, 1989 (143 pp.) 

Houses completed in the 15th century
Bouxwiller